Chaudhary Dal Singh (1915–1991) popularly known as Khunda Jhota and Paani ka Baadal was first Irrigation and Power Minister of Haryana, he was involved in Haryana politics from 1952 to 1977, when he took unofficial retirement due to his bad health. in 1966.

Early life

He was a recruitment officer of the Indian National Army founded by Subhas Chandra Bose. He remained prisoner of war in Germany, Italy during second world war. He was a very good player of Football & won Indian Army Cavalry Tournament Medal at Lahore in 1939.

As Military Man

Enrolled in the Army ( 2nd Royal Lancer ) in March 1936.
Went overseas as leader of advance party of 3rd Motor Brigade in 1941.
Taken prisoners of war by General Romel's army on 8.1.1941 at ElMichill in Libya while acting as intelligence NCO and remained prisoner of war for 4 and half Years in various countries of Europe. Released by General Paton of U.S.A. on 28 April 1945.
Worked as an interpreter for Russian and Indian Prisoners of War in Medical Department in various camps.
Opened Hindi School at Anna-Berg in Germany and Taught Hindi to about 1000 POW's.
Worked as recruiting officer of Indian legion ( I.N.A.) in Germany.
Underwent officer's course at Frontier War-fare Army School Kakaul ( Abbotabad ) & stood first in the Army School in 1946.

Travel of various Countries
Egypt, Saudi Arabia, Libya, Sicily, Italy, Germany, France Belgium & England.

Term as Member of Legislative Assembly
PEPSU LEGISLATIVE ASSEMBLY

 Jind 16.04.1952 to 04.03.1953
 Jind 26.03.1954 to 31.10.1956

PUNJAB LEGISLATIVE ASSEMBLY

 Jind 06.11.1956 to 31.03.1957
 Jind 26.01.1965 to 31.10.1966

HARYANA LEGISLATIVE ASSEMBLY

 Jind 01.11.1966 to 28.02.1967
 Julana 17.03.1967 to 21.11.1967
 Julana 26.06.1970 to 20.01.1972
 Jind 04.04.1972 to 30.04.1977

Political Arrests
 Arrested by Jind State Govt. while acting as Dictator of Jind State merger movement and parallel Govt. at Dadri was formed under his direct supervision during the merger movement. The movement is popularly known as Praja Mandal Andolan
 Arrested in 1970 at the time of Chandigarh agitation by Haryana Govt.
 Arrested on 13.02.1973 at the time of teacher's agitation by the Haryana Govt.
 Arrested on 30.05.1973 under the order of Haryana Govt. while going to address a civil liberty conference at Hansi ( Hisar ).
 Arrested on 05.05.1973 while leading a procession against Electricity Cut at Jind by Government of Haryana
 Arrested under MISA on 26.05.1975 and released on 11.05.1976 on health grounds.

Administrative Experience
 Elected General Secretary of Jat High School Jind for terms 1946–47,47–48, 1948–49 and 1955– 56.
 President District Congress Committee Sangrur 1954 to 1959.
 Vice Chairman PEPSU under developed area Advisory Board.
 Elected Member Estimate Committee, PEPSU Vidhan Sabha for the year 1954–55, 1956–57.
 Elected member, Public Accounts Committee, PEPSU Vidhan Sabha for the year 1955–56.
 Member Public relation and Grievances Committee of Sangrur district for the years 1954–57,64–66
 Elected first Chairman Panchayat Samiti Jind 1961–65.
 Hony. Sub-registrar, Jind for 2 and half years 1962–64.
 Elected first Chairman Market Committee Jind 1965–66.
 Member Civil Defence Committee, Punjab 1965.
 Irrigation and Power Minister, Haryana 01.11.1966 to 23.03.1967.
 Elected President H.P.C.C. ( O ) on 22.08.1971.

As a Member of Indian National Congress
 Elected President, Jind State Praja Mandal for the year 1947–48.
 Elected Member of Electoral College of Punjab State of Bilaspur to elect members of Constituent Assembly of India in 1947.
 Vice-President, PEPSU Youth Congress in 1949.
 President, District Congress Committee, Sangrur 1954 to 1959.
 Convenor Bharat Sewak Samaj, Tehsil Jind 1956–57.
 Elected Member AICC in 1953.
 Member PCC from 1960 to 1969.
 Elected President of HPCC (O) on 22 August 1971.

Other Information
He was dragged into controversy when an Election petition was filed against him by Mr. Ghasi Ram in Petition, the matter was finally decided by Hon'ble Supreme Court of India in case titled as Ghasi Ram vs Dal Singh reported in All India Reporter as AIR 1968 SC 1191. He was first president of Haryana unit of Indian National Congress (Organisation).

References

External links
http://haryanaassembly.gov.in/MLADetails.aspx?MLAID=663
http://eci.nic.in/eci_main/press/current/PN_17012005_Lalu.pdf
http://haryanaassembly.gov.in
https://web.archive.org/web/20100310155431/http://www.allindiareporter.in/
http://supremecourtofindia.nic.in/

State cabinet ministers of Haryana
Indian National Army personnel
Jind
1915 births
1991 deaths
The Emergency (India)
Indians imprisoned during the Emergency (India)
Indian National Congress (Organisation) politicians